Bees Make Honey may refer to:

 Bees Make Honey (band), British band
 Bees Make Honey (film), 2017 British film